Scudding Glacier is an abrupt glacier, 3 nautical miles (6 km) long, descending into the end of Alatna Valley from the south side of Mount Gunn in the Convoy Range, Victoria Land. This high elevation glacier is adjacent to the neve of Cambridge Glacier and snow laden katabatic winds make their first descent into Alatna Valley over the glacier. Even on days of relatively light winds, snow clouds derived from the high neve may be seen swirling and scudding down this glacier. So named by the 1989-90 New Zealand Antarctic Research Program (NZARP) field party to the area.

Glaciers of Scott Coast